Dindar is a name which is used as a surname and a given name. Notable people with the name include:

Surname
 Andy Dindar (born 1942), South African born English cricketer
 Ibrahim Dindar, French politician
 Nassimah Dindar (born 1960), French politician
 Nazier Dindar (1966–2015), South African cricketer
 Resul Dindar (born 1982), Turkish singer

Given name
 Dindar Najman, Iraqi politician

Turkish-language surnames